This is a list of the 329 Italian DOC (Denominazione di Origine Controllata) wines ordered by region. The wine making regions of Italy are equivalent to its twenty administrative regions. Trentino-Alto Adige/Südtirol (or just Trentino-Alto Adige), however, is subdivided into its two constituent parts.

Abruzzo
Abruzzo produced in the provinces of Chieti, L'Aquila, Pescara and Teramo.  
Cerasuolo d'Abruzzo produced in the provinces of Chieti, L'Aquila, Pescara and Teramo.
Controguerra produced in the province of Teramo.
Montepulciano d'Abruzzo produced in the provinces of Chieti, L'Aquila, Pescara and Teramo.
Terre Tollesi or ¨Tullum¨, produced in the province of Chieti.  
Trebbiano d'Abruzzo DOC provinces of Chieti, L'Aquila, Pescara and Teramo.
Villamagna produced in the province of Chieti.

Basilicata
Aglianico del Vulture produced in the province of Potenza
Matera produced in the province of Matera
Terre dell'Alta Val d'Agri produced in the province of Potenza

Calabria
Bivongi produced in the provinces of Reggio Calabria and Catanzaro
Cirò produced in the province of Crotone
Donnici produced in the province of Cosenza
Greco di Bianco produced in the province of Reggio Calabria
Lamezia produced in the province of Catanzaro
Melissa produced in the province of Crotone
Pollino produced in the province of Cosenza
Sant'Anna di Isola Capo Rizzuto produced in the provinces of Crotone and Catanzaro
San Vito di Luzzi produced in the province of Cosenza
Savuto produced in the provinces of Cosenza and Catanzaro
Scavigna produced in the province of Catanzaro
Verbicaro produced in the province of Cosenza

Campania
Aversa Asprinio produced in the provinces of Caserta and Napoli
Campi Flegrei produced in the province of Napoli
Capri produced in the province of Napoli
Castel San Lorenzo produced in the province of Salerno
Cilento produced in the province of Salerno
Costa d'Amalfi produced in the province of Salerno
Falerno del Massico produced in the province of Caserta
Falanghina del Sannio produced in the provinces of Benevento and Avellino 
Galluccio produced in the province of Caserta
Guardiolo produced in the province of Benevento
Irpinia produced in the province of Avellino
Ischia produced in the province of Napoli
Penisola Sorrentina produced in the province of Napoli
Sannio produced in the province of Benevento
Sant'Agata dei Goti produced in the province of Benevento
Solopaca produced in the province of Benevento
Taburno produced in the province of Benevento
Vesuvio produced in the province of Napoli

Emilia-Romagna
Bosco Eliceo produced in the provinces of Ferrara and Ravenna
Cagnina di Romagna  produced in the provinces of Forlì and Ravenna
Colli Bolognesi produced in the provinces of Bologna and Modena
Colli Bolognesi Classico Pignoletto produced in the province of Bologna
Colli di Faenza produced in the provinces of Forlì and Ravenna
Colli di Imola produced in the province of Bologna
Colli di Parma produced in the province of Parma
Colli di Rimini produced in the province of Rimini
Colli di Scandiano e di Canossa
Colli Piacentini produced in the province of Piacenza
Colli Romagna Centrale produced in the provinces of Ravenna and Forlì
Gutturnio produced in the province of Piacenza
Lambrusco di Sorbara produced in the province of Modena
Lambrusco Grasparossa di Castelvetro produced in the province of Modena
Lambrusco Salamino di Santacroce produced in the province of Modena
Modena produced in the province of Modena
Ortrugo produced in the province of Piacenza
Pagadebit di Romagna produced in the provinces of Ravenna and Forlì
Reggiano produced in the province of Reggio Emilia
Reno produced in the provinces of Bologna and Modena
Romagna Albana Spumante (Bianco Spumante) produced in the provinces of Bologna, Forlì and Ravenna
Sangiovese di Romagna produced in the provinces of Bologna, Forlì and Ravenna
Trebbiano di Romagna produced in the provinces of Bologna, Forlì and Ravenna

Friuli Venezia Giulia
Carso produced in the provinces of Gorizia and Trieste
Colli Orientali del Friuli produced in the province of Udine
Colli Orientali del Friuli Cialla produced in the province of Udine
Colli Orientali del Friuli Rosazzo produced in the province of Udine
Collio Goriziano (Collio) produced in the province of Gorizia
delle Venezie an inter-regional DOC produced in the provinces of Friuli-Venezia Giulia,
Trentino-Alto Adige, and Veneto
Friuli Annia produced in the province of Udine
Friuli Aquileia produced in the province of Udine
Friuli Grave produced in the provinces of Pordenone and Udine
Friuli Isonzo produced in the province of Gorizia
Friuli Latisana produced in the province of Udine
Lison Pramaggiore an inter-regional DOC produced in the provinces of Pordenone (Friuli Venezia Giulia) and Venezia and Treviso (Veneto)

Lazio
Aleatico di Gradoli produced in the province of Viterbo
Aprilia produced in the province of Latina
Atina produced in the province of Frosinone
Bianco Capena produced in the province of Roma
Castelli Romani produced in the province of Roma
Cerveteri produced in the provinces of Roma
Cesanese del Piglio or Piglio produced in the province of Frosinone
Cesanese di Affile produced in the province of Roma
Cesanese di Olevano Romano produced in the province of Roma
Circeo produced in the province of Latina
Colli Albani produced in the province of Roma
Colli della Sabina produced in the provinces of Rieti and Roma
Colli Etruschi Viterbesi produced in the province of Viterbo
Colli Lanuvini produced in the province of Roma
Cori produced in the province of Latina
Est! Est!! Est!!! di Montefiascone produced in the province of Viterbo
Frascati produced in the province of Roma
Genazzano produced in the provinces of Frosinone and Roma
Marino produced in the province of Roma
Montecompatri Colonna produced in the province of Roma
Nettuno produced in the province of Roma
Orvieto an inter-regional DOC produced in the provinces of Viterbo (Lazio) and Terni (Umbria)
Roma produced in the province of Roma
Tarquinia produced in the provinces of Roma and Viterbo
Terracina or Moscato di Terracina, produced in the province of Latrina
Velletri produced in the provinces of Latina and Roma
Vignanello produced in the province of Viterbo
Zagarolo produced in the province of Roma

Liguria
Cinque Terre
Cinque Terre Sciacchetrà produced in the province of La Spezia
Colli di Luni an inter-regional DOC produced in the provinces of La Spezia (Liguria) and of Massa-Carrara (Toscana)
Colline di Levanto produced in the province of La Spezia
Golfo del Tigullio produced in the province of Genova
Riviera Ligure di Ponente
Rossese di Dolceacqua
Val Polcevera produced in the province of Genova
Pornassio

Lombardia
Botticino produced in the province of Brescia
Bonarda dell'Otrepo Pavese produced in the province of Pavia
Buttafuoco dell'Oltrepo Pavese produced in the province of Pavia
Casteggio produced in the province of Pavia
Capriano del Colle produced in the province of Brescia
Cellatica produced in the province of Brescia
Garda an inter-regional DOC produced in the provinces of Brescia and Mantova (Lombardia) and Verona (Veneto)
Garda Colli Mantovani produced in the province of Mantova
Lambrusco Mantovano produced in the province of Mantova
Lugana an inter-regional DOC produced in the provinces of Brescia (Lombardia) and Verona (Veneto)
Oltrepò Pavese produced in the province of Pavia
Riviera del Garda Bresciano produced in the province of Brescia
San Colombano al Lambro produced in the provinces of Lodi, Milano and Pavia
San Martino della Battaglia an inter-regional DOC produced in the provinces of Brescia (Lombardia) and Verona (Veneto)
Scanzo produced in the province of Bergamo
Terre di Franciacorta produced in the province of Brescia
Valcalepio produced in the province of Bergamo
Valtellina Rosso produced in the province of Sondrio
Valtenesi produced in the province of Brescia

Marche
Bianchello del Metauro produced in the province of Pesaro-Urbino
Colli Maceratesi produced in the province of Macerata
Colli Pesaresi produced in the province of Pesaro
Esino produced in the provinces of Ancona and Macerata
Falerio dei Colli Ascolani produced in the province of Ascoli Piceno
Lacrima di Morro d'Alba produced in the province of Ancona
Offida produced in the province of Ascoli Piceno
Pergola produced in the province of Pesaro e Urbino
Rosso Conero produced in the province of Ancona
Rosso Piceno produced in the provinces of Ancona, Ascoli Piceno, Fermo and Macerata
Verdicchio dei Castelli di Jesi produced in the provinces of Ancona and Macerata
Verdicchio di Matelica produced in the provinces of Ancona and Macerata

Molise
Biferno produced in the province of Campobasso
Molise produced in the provinces of Campobasso and Isernia
Pentro di Isernia produced in the province of Isernia
Tintilia produced in the provinces of  Campobasso and Isernia

Piemonte
Albugnano produced in the province of Asti
Alta Langa produced in the provinces of Alessandria, Asti and Cuneo
Barbera d'Alba produced in the province of Cuneo
Barbera d'Asti produced in the province of Asti
Barbera del Monferrato produced in the provinces of Alessandria and Asti
Boca produced in the province of Novara
Bramaterra produced in the provinces of Biella and Vercelli
Calosso produced in the province of Asti
Canavese produced in the provinces of Biella, Torino and Vercelli
Carema produced in the province of Torino
Cisterna d'Asti produced in the provinces of Asti and Cuneo
Colli Tortonesi produced in the province of Alessandria
Collina Torinese produced in the province of Torino
Colline Novaresi produced in the province of Novara
Colline Saluzzesi produced in the province of Cuneo
Cortese dell'Alto Monferrato produced in the provinces of Alessandria and Asti
Coste della Sesia produced in the provinces of Biella and Vercelli
Dolcetto d'Acqui produced in the province of Alessandria
Dolcetto d'Alba produced in the province of Cuneo
Dolcetto d'Asti produced in the province of Asti
Dolcetto delle Langhe Monregalesi produced in the province of Cuneo
Dolcetto di Diano d'Alba produced in the province of Cuneo
Dolcetto di Dogliani produced in the province of Cuneo
Dolcetto di Ovada produced in the province of Alessandria
Erbaluce di Caluso produced in the provinces of Biella, Torino and Vercelli
Fara produced in the province of Novara
Freisa d'Asti produced in the province of Asti
Freisa di Chieri produced in the province of Torino
Gabiano produced in the province of Alessandria
Grignolino d'Asti produced in the province of Asti
Grignolino del Monferrato Casalese produced in the province of Alessandria
Langhe produced in the province of Cuneo
Lessona produced in the province of Biella
Loazzolo produced in the province of Asti
Malvasia di Casorzo d'Asti produced in the provinces of Alessandria and Asti
Malvasia di Castelnuovo Don Bosco produced in the provinces of Alessandria and Asti
Monferrato produced in the provinces of Alessandria and Asti
Nebbiolo d'Alba produced in the province of Cuneo
Piemonte produced in the provinces of Alessandria, Asti and Cuneo
Pinerolese produced in the provinces of Cuneo and Torino
Rubino di Cantavenna produced in the province of Alessandria
Ruché di Castagnole Monferrato produced in the province of Asti
Sizzano produced in the province of Novara
Valsusa produced in the province of Torino
Verduno Pelaverga produced in the province of Cuneo

Puglia
Aleatico di Puglia produced throughout the region
Alezio produced in the province of Lecce
Barletta produced in the province of Barletta-Andria-Trani
Brindisi produced in the province of Brindisi
Cacc'e mmitte di Lucera produced in the province of Foggia
Castel del Monte produced in the province of Bari
Colline Joniche Taratine produced in the province of Taranto
Copertino produced in the province of Lecce
Galatina produced in the province of Lecce
Gioia del Colle produced in the province of Bari
Gravina produced in the province of Bari
Leverano produced in the province of Lecce
Lizzano produced in the province of Taranto
Locorotondo produced in the provinces of Bari and Brindisi
Martina produced in the provinces of Bari, Brindisi and Taranto
Matino produced in the province of Lecce
Moscato di Trani produced in the provinces of Bari and Foggia
Nardò produced in the province of Lecce
Negroamaro di Terra d'Otranto produced in the province of Lecce
Orta Nova produced in the province of Foggia
Ostuni  produced in the province of Brindisi
Primitivo di Manduria  produced in the provinces of Brindisi and Taranto
Rosso Barletta produced in the provinces of Bari and Foggia
Rosso Canosa produced in the province of Bari
Rosso di Cerignola produced in the province of Bari
Salice Salentino produced in the provinces of Brindisi and Lecce
San Severo, produced in the province of Foggia
Squinzano produced in the provinces of Brindisi and Lecce
Tavoliere delle Puglie or "Tavoliere", produced in the provinces of Foggia and Barletta-Andria-Trani
Terra d'Otranto produced in the provinces of Brindisi, Lecce and Taranto

Sardegna
Alghero produced in the province of Sassari
Arborea produced in the province of Oristano
Campidano di Terralba produced in the provinces of Cagliari and Oristano
Cannonau di Sardegna produced throughout the region
Carignano del Sulcis produced in the province of Cagliari
Girò di Cagliari produced in the provinces of Cagliari and Oristano
Malvasia di Bosa produced in the province of Nuoro
Malvasia di Cagliari produced in the provinces of Cagliari and Oristano
Mandrolisai produced in the provinces of Nuoro and Oristano
Monica di Cagliari  produced in the provinces of Cagliari and Oristano
Monica di Sardegna  produced throughout the region
Moscato di Cagliari produced in the provinces of Cagliari and Oristano
Moscato di Sardegna produced throughout the region
Moscato di Sorso Sennori produced in the province of Sassari
Nasco di Cagliari produced in the provinces of Cagliari and Oristano
Nuragus di Cagliari produced in the provinces of Cagliari, Nuoro and Oristano
Sardegna Semidano produced throughout the region
Vermentino di Sardegna produced throughout the region
Vernaccia di Oristano produced in the province of Oristano

Sicilia
Alcamo produced in the provinces of Palermo and Trapani
Contea di Sclafani produced in the provinces of Agrigento, Caltanissetta and Palermo
Contessa Entellina produced in the province of Palermo
Delia Nivolelli produced in the province of Trapani
Eloro produced in the provinces of Ragusa and Siracusa
Erice produced in the province of Trapani
Etna produced in the province of Catania
Faro produced in the province of Messina
Malvasia delle Lipari produced in the province of Messina
Mamertino di Milazzo produced in the province of Messina
Marsala produced in the province of Trapani
Menfi produced in the provinces of Agrigento and Trapani
Monreale produced in the province of Palermo
Noto produced in the province of Agrigento
Moscato di Pantelleria produced in the province of Trapani
Moscato di Siracusa produced in the province of Siracusa
Riesi produced in the province of Caltanissetta
Salaparuta produced within the communal territory of Salaparuta in the province of Trapani
Sambuca di Sicilia produced in the province of Agrigento
Santa Margherita di Belice produced in the province of Agrigento
Sciacca produced in the province of Agrigento
Siracusa produced in the province of Siracusa
Vittoria produced in the provinces of Caltanisetta, Catania and Ragusa

Toscana
Ansonica Costa dell'Argentario produced in the province of Grosseto
Barco Reale di Carmignano produced in the provinces of Firenze and Prato
Bianco della Valdinievole produced in the province of Pistoia
Bianco dell'Empolese produced in the provinces of Firenze and Pistoia
Bianco di Pitigliano produced in the province of Grosseto
Bianco Pisano di San Torpè produced in the province of Pisa
Bianco Vergine della Valdichiana produced in the provinces of Arezzo and Siena
Bolgheri  produced in the province of Livorno
Candia dei Colli Apuani produced in the province of Massa-Carrara
Capalbio produced in the province of Grosseto
Colli dell'Etruria Centrale produced in the provinces of Arezzo, Firenze, Pisa, Pistoia, Prato and Siena
Colli di Luni an inter-regional DOC produced in the provinces of Massa-Carrara (Toscana) and of La Spezia (Liguria)
Colline Lucchesi produced in the province of Lucca
Cortona produced in the province of Arezzo
Elba produced in the province of Livorno
Maremma Toscana produced in the province of Grosseto
Montecarlo produced in the province of Lucca
Montecucco produced in the province of Grosseto
Monteregio di Massa Marittima produced in the province of Grosseto
Montescudaio produced in the provinces of Livorno and Pisa
Moscadello di Montalcino produced in the province of Siena
Orcia produced in the province of Siena
Parrina produced in the province of Grosseto
Pomino produced in the province of Firenze
Rosso di Montalcino produced in the province of Siena
Rosso di Montepulciano produced in the province of Siena
San Gimignano produced in the province of Siena
Sant'Antimo produced in the province of Siena
Sovana produced in the province of Grosseto
Val d'Arbia produced in the province of Siena
Vin Santo del Chianti produced in the provinces of Arezzo, Firenze, Pisa, Pistoia, Prato and Siena
Vin Santo del Chianti Classico produced in the provinces of Firenze and Siena
Vin Santo di Montepulciano produced in the province of Siena

Trentino-Alto Adige/Südtirol

South Tyrol
Wines from South Tyrol have official designations in both the Italian and German languages. Labels typically use the German form.
Südtirol, or Südtiroler (Italian: Alto Adige) produced in South Tyrol
Kalterersee, or Kalterer) (Italian: Lago di Caldaro, or Caldaro) a DOC produced both in the provinces of South Tyrol and Trentino
Valdadige an inter-regional DOC produced in the provinces of South Tyrol, Trentino and Verona
Santa Maddalena, produced in South Tyrol

Trentino
Casteller produced in the province of Trentino
delle Venezie an inter-regional DOC produced in the provinces of Friuli-Venezia Giulia,
Trentino-Alto Adige, and Veneto
Teroldego Rotaliano produced in the province of Trentino
Trentino produced in the province of Trentino
Trento a sparkling wine produced in the province of Trentino
Lago di Caldaro or Caldaro (German: Kalterersee or Kalterer) a DOC produced both in the provinces of South Tyrol and Trentino
Valdadige an inter-regional DOC produced in the provinces of South Tyrol, Trentino and Verona (Veneto)

Umbria
Amelia produced in the province of Terni
Assisi produced in the province of Perugia
Colli Altotiberini produced in the province of Perugia
Colli Amerini produced in the province of Terni
Colli del Trasimeno produced in the province of Perugia
Colli Martani produced in the province of Perugia
Colli Perugini produced in the provinces of Perugia and Terni
Lago di Corbara produced in the provinces of Perugia and Terni
Montefalco produced in the province of Perugia
Orvieto an inter-regional DOC produced in the provinces of Terni (Umbria) and Viterbo (Lazio)
Rosso Orvietano produced in the province of Terni
Spoleto produced in the province of Perugia
Todi produced in the province of Perugia
Torgiano produced in the province of Perugia

Valle d'Aosta
Valle d'Aosta

Veneto
Arcole produced in the provinces of Verona and Vicenza
Bagnoli di Sopra produced in the province of Padova
Bardolino produced in the province of Verona
Bianco di Custoza produced in the province of Verona
Breganze produced in the province of Vicenza
Colli Berici produced in the province of Vicenza
Colli di Conegliano produced in the province of Treviso
Colli Euganei produced in the province of Padova
Corti Benedettine del Padovano produced in the provinces of Padova and Venezia
delle Venezie an inter-regional DOC produced in the provinces of Friuli-Venezia Giulia,
Trentino-Alto Adige, and Veneto
Fiol Prosecco produced in the province of Treviso
Gambellara produced in the province of Vicenza
Garda an inter-regional DOC produced in the provinces of Verona (Veneto) and Brescia and Mantova (Lombardia)
Lison Pramaggiore an inter-regional DOC produced in the provinces of Venezia and Treviso (Veneto) and Pordenone (Friuli Venezia Giulia)
Lugana an inter-regional DOC produced in the provinces of Verona (Veneto) and Brescia (Lombardia)
Merlara produced in the province of Padova
Montello e Colli Asolani produced in the province of Treviso
Monti Lessini produced in the province of Vicenza
Piave  produced in the provinces of Treviso and Venezia
Prosecco produced in the province of Treviso
Riviera del Brenta produced in the provinces of Padova and Venezia
San Martino della Battaglia an inter-regional DOC produced in the provinces of Verona (Veneto) and Brescia (Lombardia)
Soave produced in the province of Verona
Valdadige an inter-regional DOC produced in the provinces of Verona (Veneto) and of Bolzano and Trento (Trentino-Alto Adige/Südtirol)
Valpolicella produced in the province of Verona
Valpolicella Ripasso produced in the province of Verona
Venezia produced in the provinces of Venezia and Treviso
Vicenza produced in the province of Vicenza
Vin Santo di Gambellara produced in the province of Vicenza

See also

List of Italian DOCG wines
Italian wine

References

Wines Doc
Italy
Wine-related lists